Lophocampa roseata, the rosy aemilia, is a moth of the subfamily Arctiinae. It was described by Francis Walker in 1868. It is found in North America in western Oregon, Washington and southwestern British Columbia. The habitat consists of conifer forests and urban landscapes.

The length of the forewings is 14–15 mm. The ground color of the forewings is light yellow with brown transverse lines and bright orange-red veins. The hindwings are translucent light yellow without markings. Adults are on wing in mid-summer.

The larvae have been successfully reared on and recorded feeding on Douglas-fir. They are covered with long hairs, and are mottled with yellow, white and black hair tufts.

Subspecies
Lophocampa roseata roseata
Lophocampa roseata occidentalis French, 1890 (Rocky Mountains, Colorado)

References

 

roseata
Moths described in 1868